Joe White (born 9 July 1988 in Swindon) is a British professional ice hockey goaltender currently playing in the Elite Ice Hockey League for the Basingstoke Bison.

White had spells with the Invicta Dynamos and the Guildford Flames before joining his hometown team the Swindon Wildcats in 2006.  After two years, he signed with the Basingstoke Bison in 2008.

External links

1988 births
Basingstoke Bison players
English ice hockey goaltenders
Guildford Flames players
Invicta Dynamos players
Living people
Sportspeople from Swindon
Swindon Wildcats players